Abraeomorphus is a genus of beetles belonging to the family Histeridae.

Species:

Abraeomorphus atomarius 
Abraeomorphus besucheti 
Abraeomorphus formosanus 
Abraeomorphus himalayae 
Abraeomorphus indosinensis 
Abraeomorphus indus 
Abraeomorphus minutissimus 
Abraeomorphus novaeguineae 
Abraeomorphus punctulus 
Abraeomorphus topali

References

Histeridae
Beetle genera